Gower is a city in Buchanan and Clinton counties in the U.S. state of Missouri and is part of the Kansas City metropolitan area. The population was 1,526 at the 2010 census.

The Buchanan County portion of Gower is part of the St. Joseph, MO–KS Metropolitan Statistical Area, while the Clinton County portion is part of the Kansas City, MO–KS Metropolitan Statistical Area.

History

 The city was named after A. G. Gower, a railroad official.

Geography
Gower is located at  (39.611381, -94.597656).

Demographics

2010 census
As of the census of 2010, there were 1,526 people, 561 households, and 408 families living in the city. The racial makeup of the city was 98.4% White, 0.4% African American, 0.1% Native American, 0.2% Asian, and 1.0% from two or more races. Hispanic or Latino of any race were 0.4% of the population.

There were 561 households, of which 38.5% had children under the age of 18 living with them, 58.3% were married couples living together, 11.6% had a female householder with no husband present, 2.9% had a male householder with no wife present, and 27.3% were non-families. 24.1% of all households were made up of individuals, and 11.3% had someone living alone who was 65 years of age or older. The average household size was 2.60 and the average family size was 3.08.

The median age in the city was 37.9 years. 26.5% of residents were under the age of 18; 7.7% were between the ages of 18 and 24; 24.6% were from 25 to 44; 24.7% were from 45 to 64; and 16.3% were 65 years of age or older. The gender makeup of the city was 48.1% male and 51.9% female.

2000 census
As of the census of 2000, there were 1,399 people, 536 households, and 393 families living in the city. The racial makeup of the city was 99.36% White, 0.14% African American, 0.14% Native American, and 0.36% from two or more races. Hispanic or Latino of any race were 0.79% of the population.

There were 536 households, out of which 38.4% had children under the age of 18 living with them, 61.2% were married couples living together, 9.9% had a female householder with no husband present, and 26.5% were non-families. 22.8% of all households were made up of individuals, and 14.6% had someone living alone who was 65 years of age or older. The average household size was 2.61 and the average family size was 3.09.

In the city the population was spread out, with 28.2% under the age of 18, 8.4% from 18 to 24, 29.8% from 25 to 44, 20.1% from 45 to 64, and 13.6% who were 65 years of age or older. The median age was 36 years. For every 100 females, there were 88.5 males. For every 100 females age 18 and over, there were 85.8 males.

The median income for a household in the city was $48,125, and the median income for a family was $55,694. Males had a median income of $35,313 versus $24,563 for females. The per capita income for the city was $19,408. About 2.4% of families and 3.8% of the population were below the poverty line, including 4.8% of those under age 18 and 3.5% of those age 65 or over.

Schools

East Buchanan C-1 School District 
The East Buchanan C-1 School District administration is headquartered in Gower, MO. The high school and elementary school are in Gower, where the middle school is located in nearby Easton, MO.

References

External links
 Historic maps of Gower in the Sanborn Maps of Missouri Collection at the University of Missouri

Cities in Buchanan County, Missouri
Cities in Clinton County, Missouri
St. Joseph, Missouri metropolitan area 
Kansas City metropolitan area 
Cities in Missouri